The 2012 Caribbean Cup was the 17th edition of the Caribbean Cup, an international football competition for national teams of member nations affiliated with the Caribbean Football Union (CFU) of the CONCACAF region. The final stage was hosted by Antigua and Barbuda. The tournament determined the four Caribbean teams that qualified for the 2013 CONCACAF Gold Cup.

Originally the competition's final round was to be scheduled for June and July however it was delayed. 
The title was won by Cuba for the first time.

Qualification

The first and second rounds were scheduled for August and September, and October respectively. The draw for the qualifying round was made in March 2012.

The following teams qualified:
 (Automatic qualification as host)
 (Automatic qualification as title holders)
 (Qualification as Group 6 winners)
 (Qualification as Group 6 runners-up)
 (Qualification as Group 7 winners)
 (Qualification as Group 7 runners-up)
 (Qualification as Group 8 winners)
 (Qualification as Group 8 runners-up)

Preparations
This is the first international tournament organised by the CFU since the corruption scandal. Prior to hosting the tournament, Paul "Chet" Greene, a former General Secretary of the Antigua and Barbuda Football Association raised concerns that Antigua's FA may not be able to afford to host the tournament and suggested that it would require state aid. It was the incumbent ABFA General Secretary Derrick Gordon that went on to become the President of the Caribbean Football Union and ultimately select the host nation. Greene stated, "Antigua [are] not necessarily in a position to give as [much] they normally would, I think government becomes the only option at this stage and a call for larger than usual attendances to allow the association to pay the bills." Greene also said that in the event of a grant from the CFU (via CONCACAF), the association would "still have a chunk of expenses to bear."

ABFA President Everton Gonsalves responded, "the value to football is not something that can be valued in dollars." CFU President Gordon Derrick stated that "Football is an expensive venture in all aspects; development comes at a cost so monies have to be spent." At the 2013 CFU Congress, Derrick Gordon stated that they could not come to an agreement with usual sponsors Digicel as they "couldn't agree on a deal in time for the Caribbean Cup, as Digicel's budget year had closed."

Venues
Two venues have been chosen to host the tournament.

Squads

Draw
Teams were allocated to this stage based on a fixed draw. The draw was decided thus:

Group A
Host
Group 6 winner
Group 7 runners-up
Group 8 winner

Group B
Previous competition winner
Group 6 runner-up
Group 7 winner
Group 8 runner-up

The result of the draw was amended on 19 November, the Group 7 runner-up was transferred to Group B and the Group 7 winner was transferred to Group A. As a result of the amendment Group A contains three qualifying group winners and the host, whilst Group B contains three qualifying group runners-up and the previous edition competition winner. Martinique, the team transferred to Group B containing no qualifying group-winners, is the only association in the competition with a CFU Executive Committee member (Maurice Victoire) besides hosts Antigua and Barbuda (Gordon Derrick).

Group stage
The complete schedule for finals was released on 20 November.

Tiebreakers
Greater number of points in matches between the tied teams.
Greater goal difference in matches between the tied teams (if more than two teams finish equal on points).
Greater number of goals scored in matches among the tied teams (if more than two teams finish equal on points).
Greater goal difference in all group matches.
Greater number of goals scored in all group matches.
Drawing of lots.

All times local (UTC−4)

Group A

Group B

Knockout phase
All teams that reach this phase qualified for the 2013 CONCACAF Gold Cup.

In case of tie, extra time is played, and if still tied, the match is decided by a penalty shoot-out.

Semi-finals

Third place play-off

Final

Notes

Prize money
The winner received US $120k, the runner-up received US $85k, the third-place team received US $70k and the fourth-placed team received US $50K.

Goalscorers
2 goals

 Peter Byers
 Ariel Martínez
 Kerbi Rodríguez
 Gary Pigrée
 Jean-Philippe Peguero
 Leonel Saint-Preux
 Kévin Parsemain
 Frédéric Piquionne

1 goal

 Quinton Griffith
 Yoel Colomé
 Aliannis Urgellés
 Marcel Hernández
 Jonathan Faña
 César García
 Jean-Claude Darcheville
 Rhudy Evens
 Tremaine Stewart
 Anthony Angély
 Kevon Carter
 Kevin Molino
 Richard Roy

References

External links
Official Facebook Page
Results from CONCACAF

 
2012
2012–13 in Caribbean football
2012
2012–13 in Antigua and Barbuda football
2012–13 in Trinidad and Tobago football
2012–13 in Jamaican football
December 2012 sports events in North America